The longnose sawshark (Pristiophorus cirratus) or common sawshark, is a sawshark of the family Pristiophoridae.

Description
The longnose sawshark has a slender, slightly flattened body with a very long rostrum that can make up to 30% of its total body length. It has pale yellow or grayish-brown dorsal coloring, white ventral coloring, and variegated, sometimes faint dark blotches, spots, and bars on its back. The barbels of the longnose sawshark are halfway down the rostrum, but slightly closer to the rostral tip than the nostrils. The longnose sawshark can be confused with one of many species of sawfish, a family of rays, but is distinguished by the five gills located on the sides of its head, as opposed to sawfish which have gills located on the underside of the head.

Distribution and habitat
The longnose sawshark is found in the eastern Indian Ocean around southern Australia and Tasmania on the continental shelf at depths of 20 - 600m.

Biology and ecology

Longnose sawsharks feed primarily on small crustaceans. Individuals find prey by running their barbels over the ocean floor. They use the teeth on their snouts to stir up sediment and strike prey.

Like all sawsharks, reproduction is ovoviviparous. Longnose sawsharks give birth every other winter to between 6 and 19 pups in a litter. After a 12-month gestation period, pups are born  in length. Their teeth are folded against the snout at birth, which protects the mother from harm. Longnose sawsharks are highly productive in comparison to other shark species, maturing quickly and only living for around 15 years.

Human interaction
The longnose sawshark is listed as Least Concern by the International Union for Conservation of Nature (IUCN). It used to be listed as Near Threatened, but data gathered after 2000 ultimately led to the new classification. Longnose sawsharks are highly productive and are protected by laws that keep their catch rate stable. Large tracts of their range are protected from all shark fishing, helping to buffer their population loss. Their meat is fairly popular in Australia and is said to have an excellent taste. Because of its deep habitat and overall behavior, the longnose sawshark is not a threat to humans.

References

External links
 
 

 Pristiophorus cirratus at shark-references.com
 Fishes of Australia : Pristiophorus cirratus

longnose sawshark
Marine fish of Southern Australia
longnose sawshark
Taxa named by John Latham (ornithologist)